John Trickey is an Australian tennis coach and former professional player.

Trickey, a junior state champion in Victoria, competed on the professional tour during the 1970s and was a regular at the Australian Open. He featured in men's doubles main draws at both the French Open and Wimbledon.

From 1998 to 2003 he served as Tennis Australia's national women's coach.

References

External links
 
 

Year of birth missing (living people)
Living people
Australian male tennis players
Australian tennis coaches
Tennis people from Victoria (Australia)